George Almones (September 21, 1962 – December 20, 2012) was an American professional basketball player.

Standing at 6"4', Almones attended the University of Southwestern Louisiana for three seasons from 1982–83 through 1984–85 before giving up his senior eligibility to turn pro early. He was a sixth-round draft choice of the New Jersey Nets in 1985 but has not played in the NBA. He performed with the CBA's Florida Suncoast Stingers in 1985–86 and was the Continental league's seventh-leading scorer in the 1986–87 season, hitting at a 22.1 point clip on .445 field goal shooting in 48 appearances with the Charleston Gunners, Almones served time with the Gunners and Wyoming Wildcatters in the following season.

In December 2012, Almones died at age 50 in his hometown of Lakeland, Florida, due from complications of heart failure.

References

1962 births
2012 deaths
Basketball players from Florida
Charleston Gunners players
Louisiana Ragin' Cajuns men's basketball players
New Jersey Nets draft picks
Sportspeople from Lakeland, Florida
Wyoming Wildcatters players
American men's basketball players
American expatriate basketball people in the Philippines
Philippine Basketball Association imports
Great Taste Coffee Makers players